Badr Al-Sulaitin (born 16 July 1990) is a Saudi Arabian footballer who plays as a midfielder.

References
 Profile

1990 births
Living people
Saudi Arabian footballers
Al-Shabab FC (Riyadh) players
Al-Raed FC players
Al-Adalah FC players
Al-Shoulla FC players
Saudi Professional League players
Saudi First Division League players
Association football midfielders